No Face may refer to:
No Face, a character in Hayao Miyazaki's Spirited Away
Noppera-bō, the Japanese legendary creature that was its inspiration 
No Face Records
No Face (rap duo)